Feudin', Fussin' and A-Fightin'  is a 1948 American musical comedy film directed by George Sherman and starring Donald O'Connor. Also featured are Marjorie Main and Percy Kilbride, (who later reprised essentially the same roles as Ma and Pa Kettle), with Penny Edwards as the perky love interest. It was produced and distributed by Universal Studios.

Plot
Donald O'Connor plays Wilbur McMurtry, a traveling salesman who is captured and held hostage by the local authorities in a small town, who wish to compel him to run in the annual foot-race against a rival town. A highlight of the film is his brilliant dance routine, in a barn, to the Al Jolson song, "Me and My Shadow".

Production
In January 1948 Universal announced they would make a film based on the magazine story The Wonderful Race at Rimrock which would be filmed the following month. It reunited Maine and Kilbridge from The Egg and I. Maine was borrowed from MGM.

O'Connor has a dance number which involves running up a wall, which later inspired his "Make 'Em Laugh" routine in Singing in the Rain.

Cast
 Donald O'Connor as	Wilbur McMurty
 Marjorie Main as 	Maribel Mathews
 Percy Kilbride as 	Billy Caswell
 Penny Edwards as 	Libby Mathews
 Joe Besser as 	Sharkey Dolan
 Harry Shannon as 	Chauncey
 Fred Kohler Jr. as 	Emory Tuttle
 Howland Chamberlain as Doc Overholt
 Edmund Cobb as Stage Driver
 Joel Friedkin as Stage Passenger
 I. Stanford Jolley as 	Guard

References

External links
 
 Remembering a Hoofer: An Interview with Donald O'Connor

1948 films
1948 musical comedy films
Universal Pictures films
American musical comedy films
Films directed by George Sherman
Films scored by Leith Stevens
American black-and-white films
1940s American films